Smash Mouth is the third studio album by American rock band Smash Mouth. It was released on November 27, 2001 by Interscope Records. It is notable in that it was their first album with new drummer Michael Urbano and its release was delayed a few months due to the death of lead vocalist Steve Harwell's son, Presley Scott Harwell. The album was eventually certified Gold by the RIAA for sales in excess of 500,000 in the U.S.

Smash Mouth held a contest on their website in the fall of 2000 to name their third album. The result was a two-way tie with the winning suggestion being to self-title the album. It was released in the fall of 2001 along with the single "Pacific Coast Party".

Track listing

Personnel
Smash Mouth
Steve Harwell – lead vocals
Paul De Lisle – bass, backing vocals
Greg Camp – guitars, backing vocals
Michael Urbano – drums, percussion
Michael Klooster – keyboards, backing vocals

Additional personnel
Eric Valentine – producer, engineer, mixer
David Campbell – string arrangements

Charts

Weekly charts

Year-end charts

References

External links

Smash Mouth at YouTube (streamed copy where licensed)
The Official Smash Mouth site

Smash Mouth albums
2001 albums
Interscope Records albums
Albums produced by Eric Valentine